Lenka Černovská (born 16 December 1985) is a Czech curler.

Teams

Women's

Mixed

References

External links

Czech national women team (2012) - Czech Curling Federation (web archive)
Černovská Lenka (CC DION) - Player statistics (all games with his/her participation) - Czech Curling Association

Living people
1985 births
Czech female curlers
Place of birth missing (living people)